Fighting Cressy is a lost 1919 silent film western directed by Robert Thornby and starring Blanche Sweet. It was produced by Jesse D. Hampton and distributed through Pathé Exchange.

Cast
 Blanche Sweet - Cressy
 Russell Simpson - Hiram McKinstry
 Edward Peil, Sr. - John Ford (* as Edward Peil)
 Pell Trenton - Joe Masters
 Antrim Short - Seth Davis
 Frank Lanning - Old Man Harrison
 Billie Bennett - Mrs. Dabney
 Georgie Stone - Georgie
 Walter Perry - Uncle Ben Dabney
 Eunice Murdock Moore - Ma McKinstry (* as Eunice Moore)

See also
 Blanche Sweet filmography

References

External links

 
 
 lantern slide(archived)

1919 films
1919 Western (genre) films
Lost American films
Films directed by Robert Thornby
Pathé Exchange films
Lost Western (genre) films
1919 lost films
Silent American Western (genre) films
1910s American films